"Let Your Yeah Be Yeah" is a song written by Jamaican singer Jimmy Cliff.  It was first recorded by vocal trio The Pioneers, whose version, co-produced by Cliff, reached no. 5 on the UK singles chart in 1971.

Background
The lyrics are based on Matthew 5:37 "But let your communication be, Yea, yea; Nay, nay: for whatsoever is more than these cometh of evil."

Other recordings
In 1973, it was recorded by American rock band Brownsville Station for their album Yeah!.  Released as a single, it was the band's second song to chart on the Billboard Hot 100, reaching no. 57.
Cliff also released the song as a single in 1975 on Island Records, but it did not chart.
A cover of this song was recorded by, Ali Campbell, the lead singer of the British reggae band UB40, for his solo album Big Love in 1995. It was released as a single and reached no. 25 in the U.K.

References

1971 singles
1973 singles
Reggae songs
Brownsville Station (band) songs
Songs written by Jimmy Cliff
1971 songs